Mark Anthony Gonzalez (born September 9, 1994) is a Canadian soccer player.

Club career
Gonzalez spent four years playing college soccer at the University of Evansville between 2012 and 2015.

While at college, Gonzalez appeared for Sigma FC in League 1 Ontario, and Premier Development League side TFC Academy.

Gonzalez was signed by United Soccer League side Swope Park Rangers on January 20, 2016.

Gonzalez moved to USL side Reno 1868 on January 5, 2018. Gonzalez was released by Reno on December 3, 2018.

International career

Mark Anthony Gonzalez was called in to the Canada Under-23 National Team for a tournament in March 2017 in Qatar. The Canada U-23s played a pair of games against Uzbekistan and Qatar on March 25 and 28, 2017 respectively.

Career statistics

References

1994 births
Living people
Canadian people of Cuban descent
Canadian soccer players
Evansville Purple Aces men's soccer players
Toronto FC players
Sporting Kansas City II players
Reno 1868 FC players
Association football forwards
Soccer players from Toronto
USL League Two players
USL Championship players
Expatriate soccer players in the United States
Sigma FC players